Riyadh summit may refer to:

 the 2007 Arab League summit
 the 2017 Riyadh summit during a visit by US President Donald Trump to Saudi Arabia
 the 2020 G20 Riyadh summit